Levi Goodrich (1822–1887) was an American architect based in San Jose, California. His most notable projects include San Jose City Hall, Santa Clara County Courthouse, San Jose City Hall, and California State Normal School. Goodrich's wife, Sarah Knox-Goodrich, was a well known activist who worked for women's suffrage in California.

Biography
Levi Goodrich was born January 1, 1822, in New York City, New York. His parents died when he was young, and he lived with relatives in Stockbridge, Massachusetts. Goodrich became a carpenter, then studied architecture in the office of R. G Hatfield in New York City.

On March 8, 1849, Goodrich sailed for California via Cape Horn on the ship Loochoo arriving on September 16, 1849. He traveled with a large quantity of building materials and sold them upon arriving in San Francisco. Soon after arriving, he designed the Parker house, a wood-framed building on Portsmouth Square. The building, at the corner of Washington and Kearny Streets, was built to replace tents used by Gold Rush miners. It was reportedly the first work in San Francisco by a professional architect.

Goodrich moved to San Jose, California in November 1849. His architectural offices were in the Knox Block.

On April 13, 1854, Goodrich married Juliet Peck. They had a son, E. B. Goodrich, who joined his father's office and, eventually, succeeded him.

Goodrich married Sarah Knox on January 15, 1879. She was prominent in the cause of equal rights for women, fully supported by her husband.

Goodrich retired in 1886. On April 2, 1887, he suffered an attack of apoplexy while visiting San Diego with his wife, and quickly died. He is buried in Oak Hill Cemetery in San Jose.

Buildings

San Jose

 1851, an adobe house at Santa Clara and Lightstone Streets, with J. D. Hoppe
 1851, two one-story adobe buildings on Santa Clara Street, for Frank Lightson
 1853, part of the Women's College of Notre Dame and convent
 c. 1854, Thomas Fallon House, 175 West St. John Street, a two-story Italianate villa, now a museum
 1855, San Jose City Hall, 35 North Market Street, designed to resemble a medieval castle with parapets and towers; destroyed in the 1906 San Francisco earthquake
 1863, First Presbyterian Church of San Jose; destroyed in the 1906 San Francisco earthquake
 1866–1868, Santa Clara County Courthouse, 161 North 1st Street, a two-story Neoclassical building with a dome, overlooking St. James Square; destroyed by fire in 1931
 1869–1871, county jailhouse
 1880, California State Normal School
 University of the Pacific
 Also, Knox Block (Goodrich's office was in room 20 of this building), three public school buildings, Bank of San Jose, and Martin Block

San Diego

 1872, San Diego County Courthouse, a Classical-style building on land donated by Alonzo E. Horton
 1882, Independent Order of Odd Fellows building, at 526 Market Street, listed on the National Register of Historic Places

Other places
 Monterey County Courthouse
 1949, Parker House Hotel, San Francisco, CA

Goodrich Quarry
In 1874, Goodrich purchased a 500-acre sandstone quarry that came to be known as Goodrich's Free-Stone Quarry. The quarry is about eight miles south of San Jose in the Santa Teresa Hills on the eastern slope of the Almaden Valley. After Goodrich's death, the quarry was leased, and then sold, to the quarry's stone master Jacob Pfeiffer. It was renamed Graystone Quarry.

The stone from the Goodrich/Graystone quarry has been used in many California buildings including the front walls and cornices of the Stanford University quadrangle the Santa Clara County Courthouse, U.S. Post Office in San Jose (now the San Jose Museum of Art), California State Normal School, Lick Observatory, University of the Pacific, the Knox-Goodrich Building, San Carlos Railroad Depot, and Agnews State Hospital.

References

Sources

 
 
 
 
 
 

1822 births
1887 deaths
Architects from California
19th-century American architects
People from San Jose, California